Jude Rogers (born 1978) is a Welsh journalist, lecturer, arts critic and broadcaster. She is a music critic for The Guardian and also regularly writes features and articles for The Observer, New Statesman and women's magazines such as Red. Her articles have also been published by The Times and by BBC Music and she broadcasts on BBC Radio 2, BBC Radio 4 and BBC 6 Music. She is a senior lecturer in journalism at London Metropolitan University.

Early life and education
Rogers was born and bred in two villages near Swansea, where she went to comprehensive school. In 1997 Rogers became president of the students' union at Wadham College, Oxford. She has a degree in English from the University of Oxford and an MA from Royal Holloway.

Professional career
In 2003, Rogers co-founded the magazine Smoke: a London Peculiar. After working as reviews editor on The Word, she became a full-time freelancer in 2007.

She has been a judge on several music prize panels, including the Welsh Music Prize and the Mercury Prize, and was one of ten experts chosen to write for the University of Westminster's MusicTank 10:10 project, writing about the future of music journalism.

In 2017 she scripted an audio guided tour, narrated by Jarvis Cocker, for ABBA: Super Troupers, an exhibition at the Southbank Centre, London  on the Swedish pop group ABBA.

Personal life
She and her husband Dan, whom she married in 2011,  have a son, Evan, born in 2014. They live in Monmouthshire, Wales, having moved there in 2016 from Leyton, north east London.

Publications
 Matt Haynes (editor) and Jude Rogers (editor): From the Slopes of Olympus to the Banks of the Lea, Smoke: a London Peculiar, 2013 
 Jude Rogers and Alex Farebrother-Naylor: Pop!, Fisherton Press, 2016 
Jude Roger’s ‘The Sound of Being Human: How Music Shapes Our Lives’, White Rabbit Books (2022)

References

External links
Official website
Jude Rogers at The Guardian

1978 births
Living people
Academics of London Metropolitan University
Alumni of Royal Holloway, University of London
Alumni of Wadham College, Oxford
British magazine founders
British music journalists
British women journalists
The Guardian journalists
New Statesman people
People from Swansea
Welsh broadcasters
Welsh journalists
Welsh women journalists
Welsh scholars and academics